Hillestad is a village in Åmli municipality in Agder county, Norway. The village is located in the Tovdal valley along the river Tovdalselva. From 1908 until 1967, the valley was a separate municipality called Tovdal and during that time, Hillestad was its administrative centre. Tovdal Church is located in the village.

References

Åmli
Villages in Agder